Gomon is a surname. Notable people with the surname include:

 Josephine Gomon (1892–1975), American activist
 Yevgeniya Gomon (born 1995), Ukrainian rhythmic gymnast

See also